Sam D. Hamilton (July 5, 1955 – February 20, 2010) was the 15th director of the United States Fish and Wildlife Service from September 1, 2009 until February 20, 2010.

Hamilton, a native of Lawrenceville, Georgia, received his bachelor's degree from Mississippi State University in 1977.

Prior to his appointment as Director of the United States Fish and Wildlife Service, Hamilton served as the agency's southeast regional director, based in Atlanta, Georgia. Hamilton was credited with leading the restoration efforts in the Florida Everglades. He also oversaw coastal fort restoration efforts along the Gulf of Mexico following Hurricane Katrina and Hurricane Rita, both of which damaged wildlife refuges, wetlands and other habitats.

He was appointed the director of the United States Fish and Wildlife Service in 2009 and was sworn in on September 15, 2009.

Sam Hamilton suffered a heart attack while skiing at the Keystone Resort in Keystone, Colorado. He died on February 20, 2010, at the age of 54. He was survived by his wife, Becky; sons, Sam Jr. and Clay; and a grandson, Davis.

In February 2012, the Noxubee National Wildlife Refuge, was renamed to Sam D. Hamilton Noxubee National Wildlife Refuge in honor of Hamilton.

References

External links
 Sam D. Hamilton biography
 U.S. Fish and Wildlife Service Mourns Loss of Director Sam Hamilton
 Official web site of the U.S. Fish and Wildlife Service

1955 births
2010 deaths
Mississippi State University alumni
People from Lawrenceville, Georgia
United States Fish and Wildlife Service personnel